The following is a list of notable events and releases of the year 2019 in Swedish music.

Events

January

February

March 
 22 – The Blue House Youth Jazz Festival started in Stockholm (March 22 – 24).

April

May

June 
 5 – The 26th Sweden Rock Festival starts in Norje (June 5 – 8).
 13 – The Hultsfred Festival starts in Småland (June 13 – 15).

July 
 4 – The 20th Peace & Love Festival starts in Borlänge (July 4 – 6).
 26 – The Norberg Festival opens (July 26 – 28).
 27 – The Uppsala Reggae Festival starts (July 27 – 28).

August 
 1 – The Arvika Festival opens in Värmland (August 1 – 3).
 2 – The Storsjöyran opens in Östersund (August 2 – 3).
 8 – The Way Out West starts in Gothenburg (August 8 – 10).

September

October 
 25 – The 52nd Umeå Jazz Festival starts in Umeå (October 25 – 26).

November

December

Albums released

January

Deaths
9 December  - Marie Fredriksson, 61, Swedish singer-songwriter (Roxette)

See also 
 2019 in Sweden
 Sweden in the Eurovision Song Contest 2019
 List of number-one singles and albums in Sweden (see 2018 section on page)

References

 
Swedish music by year
Swedish
Music